Desert Christian Schools may refer to:
Desert Christian Schools (Arizona)
Desert Christian Schools (California)